A Woman's Heart may refer to:

 A Woman's Heart (compilation album), a 1992 compilation album by six female Irish artists
 A Woman's Heart (Crystal Gayle album), 1980
 "A Woman's Heart", a single by Chris de Burgh from the 1999 album Quiet Revolution
 A Woman's Heart (film), a 1926 American silent melodrama film

See also
 Heart of a Woman (disambiguation)
 "In a Woman's Heart", a 1996 Eurovision Song Contest entry by Miriam Christine
 "Only a Woman's Heart", a 1992 song by Eleanor McEvoy